Bernardo Carbo (born August 5, 1947) is an American former outfielder and designated hitter who played from  through  for the Cincinnati Reds (1969–72), St. Louis Cardinals (1972–73, 1979–80), Boston Red Sox (1974–76, 1977–78), Milwaukee Brewers (1976), Cleveland Indians (1978) and Pittsburgh Pirates (1980). He batted left-handed and threw right-handed.  He was raised in the Detroit suburb of Livonia and graduated in 1965 from Franklin High School, playing for the school's baseball team while there.

Career
Carbo was an outfielder who started his career with Cincinnati. He had been the Reds' number-one draft pick in the inaugural 1965 draft, ahead of Johnny Bench. In his 1970 rookie season, Carbo posted career highs in batting average (.310), home runs (21), runs batted in (63), hits (113), on-base percentage (.454), slugging average (.551), OPS (1.005) and games played (125). Carbo was selected Rookie of the Year by The Sporting News, but he slumped in the next two seasons and was sent to the Cardinals.

Boston
Carbo was traded along with Rick Wise from the Cardinals to the Red Sox for Reggie Smith and Ken Tatum on October 26, 1973. He said of coming to Boston: "When I first met [Red Sox owner] Mr. Yawkey, he was shining shoes in the clubhouse," said Carbo, "and I went up to him and gave him $20 and told him to get me a cheeseburger and fries." While playing for the Red Sox, he was a part of the "Buffalo Heads", with Bill "Spaceman" Lee and Ferguson Jenkins. Carbo would also carry around a giant stuffed gorilla that was named Mighty Joe Young. The gorilla sat next to him in the middle seat on planes. Carl Yastrzemski wanted the gorilla placed on the bat rack in the dugout.

The 1975 World Series matched the Red Sox with the heavily favored Cincinnati Reds, who were looking for their first title since 1940. Boston had also suffered a drought by not winning a Series since 1918. The clubs battled back and forth, with the Reds winning three of the first five games. Carbo was excited to see some of his old teammates. Carbo would be on the bench, and his former teammates were sympathetic. Clay Carroll inscribed a picture for him and it read "Good luck in the World Series." After Game 3, when Carbo hit a home run off him, Carbo said, "They told me Carroll was in here and just went crazy, ripping up the picture into little pieces."

Game 6 was postponed three days because of rain. Carbo did not join his teammates for batting practice at Tufts University because he said he couldn't find it. He spent the early part of Game 6 working on his Louisville Slugger. "I’m sitting there and I’m whittling this bat, I took a lathe and took all the polish off. It's nice and smooth. Rick Wise is sitting next to me and says, ‘You know, you can’t use that bat. It doesn’t have an emblem on it.’ So as the game was going I took a magic marker and wrote ‘Louisville Slugger’ on it. That's how I kept myself amused."

In Game 6 (October 21), with two outs and two batters on base in the eighth inning, Roger Moret was scheduled to bat. Darrell Johnson told Carbo to get ready.  And I said, "Hey, I’m not going to hit. Juan Beníquez, grab a bat, you’re going to hit. Sparky's going to go to the lefthander because Sparky goes by the book." Darrell said, "Well, go up and stand on the on-deck circle." And they introduced me. So I’m still thinking Sparky will come out and take Rawly Eastwick out and go with Will McEnaney. But the umpire says, "C’mon, you’ve been announced, you’re hitting."

So I go into the batter's box. I ain’t ready to hit. Next thing, strike one, strike two, ball one, ball two. Then he threw me a cut fastball, a little slider and I took it right out of Bench's glove — the ball just dribbled out. I step out and I’m thinking, "Aw man, I almost struck out. I was lucky."

I hit the next pitch to center field. I rounded first base and I saw César Gerónimo going back. Rounding second, I knew it was gone and I’m yelling to Pete Rose, "Don’t you wish you were this strong?" And Pete is yelling back, "Ain’t this fun, Bernie? This is what the World Series is about. This is fun."

Johnny Bench said after the game it looked like a Little Leaguer learning how to hit. Pete Rose said it was the worst swing he ever saw. Don Zimmer said he thought it was over. Rico Petrocelli said it looked like a pitcher who hurt his arm, trying to make a comeback as a hitter.

Carbo's pinch three-run home run tied the score 6-6, paving the way for Carlton Fisk's game-winning homer in the bottom of the twelfth for a 7-6 Red Sox victory. Carbo's pinch homer was his second of the Series, tying Chuck Essegian's 16-year-old record for most in a World Series. Game 7, watched by an estimated 71 million TV viewers, saw the Reds triumph in the ninth inning on a bloop single by Joe Morgan for a 4-3 win.

Tom Yawkey would pass away in 1976, and Carbo wept. Carbo saw Yawkey as a father figure, because his father did not really care about him. Even after his game tying home run in Game 6, he waited all night for a call and did not receive one. New owners Haywood Sullivan and Buddy LeRoux hired a private detective to follow Carbo.

Later career
He was eventually sold to the Cleveland Indians in June 1978. This made Bill Lee mad and he called the owners "gutless" and staged a walkout.

His major league career ended in 1980 with the Pittsburgh Pirates. Carbo went on to cosmetology school and opened a hairdressing salon. In 1985, in a federal drug distribution trial, former Cardinal Keith Hernandez said Carbo was the man who introduced him to cocaine in 1980. Carbo subsequently lost his house and his salon because of the bad publicity.

In 1989–90, while playing in a senior league in St. Petersburg, Florida, Carbo hit rock bottom. His mother had committed suicide, his father died two months later, and his family was disintegrating. He was spending $32,000 a month on drugs (mostly cocaine). Dalton Jones, a member of the Red Sox 1967 Impossible Dream team, took one look at Carbo and said, "You need Jesus."

In a 12-year career, Carbo was a .264 hitter with 96 home runs and 358 RBI in 1010 games.

Carbo was the field manager for the Pensacola Pelicans from 2003 to 2005. Carbo compiled a record of 150–103 in his three seasons as the field manager, a winning percentage of .593. He led the Pelicans to the championship series in the independent Southeastern League in 2003, losing to the Baton Rouge RiverBats. Carbo resigned in February 2006, in order to return full-time to Diamond Club Ministry.

Admissions to drug use
On April 1, 2010, in an interview with the Boston Globe, Carbo admitted to doing drugs during the 1975 World Series.  He states, "I probably smoked two joints, drank about three or four beers, got to the ballpark, took some [amphetamines], took a pain pill, drank a cup of coffee, chewed some tobacco, had a cigarette, and got up to the plate and hit."  It was not just a one-time binge, however.  In the same article, Carbo states, "I played every game high. I was addicted to anything you could possibly be addicted to. I played the outfield sometimes where it looked like the stars were falling from the sky."

"I threw away my career", said Carbo. "If I knew Jesus Christ was my savior at 17, I would have been one heck of a ballplayer, a near Hall of Famer. Instead, I wanted to die."

Carbo was out of baseball by age 33.

After baseball
After retiring, he spent time as a hairdresser.

He has since become a born again Christian.  In 1993, he founded the evangelical organization "Diamond Club Ministry."  and now spends his time ministering to families and their children through his love for the game. He says he has not used drugs or alcohol in over fifteen years.

On November 10, 2004, he was inducted to the Boston Red Sox Hall of Fame.

See also
 The Sporting News Rookie of the Year Award

Sources
The ESPN Baseball Encyclopedia – Gary Gillette, Peter Gammons, Pete Palmer. Publisher: Sterling Publishing, 2005. Format: Paperback, 1824pp. Language: English. 
 Baseball's 25 Greatest Moments
The Red Sox may not have won the 1975 World Series. But they certainly did not lose.
The Sporting News
Cleaned-Up Hitter

References

External links
 Bernie Carbo Webpage

 https://www.facebook.com/profile.php?id=100001078563115#!/pages/Bernie-Carbo/136839046351460

1947 births
Living people
Boston Red Sox players
Cincinnati Reds players
Cleveland Indians players
Major League Baseball designated hitters
Baseball players from Detroit
Major League Baseball right fielders
Milwaukee Brewers players
Sportspeople from Livonia, Michigan
Pittsburgh Pirates players
St. Louis Cardinals players
Minor league baseball managers
Tampa Tarpons (1957–1987) players
Peninsula Grays players
Knoxville Smokies players
Asheville Tourists players
Indianapolis Indians players
Evansville Triplets players
Winter Haven Super Sox players
American Association (1902–1997) MVP Award winners
Converts to evangelical Christianity
American evangelicals